Paribar is a 2004 Bengali  family  drama film directed by Anup Sengupta and produced by Anup Sengupta and Apurba Saha. The film feature actors Prosenjit Chatterjee, Ranjit Mallick and Rachana Banerjee in the lead roles. Ashok Bhadra composed the music for the film.

Plot 
The story of the film revolves around a family, the members of which include Sagar, his parents and his siblings. One of Sagar's hands got paralyzed in an accident, in an attempt to save his mother. He and his younger brother Rahul worked in a factory. Rahul was married to Swapna, who started smuggling the factory goods illegally. When the whole matter came to light, Sagar took the blame on himself, despite of knowing the real fact. The only result was Sagar's losing the job. Later, when Sagar went to Rahul for borrowing some money due to his mother's ill health, he was harassed by his brother and an embarrassed Sagar returned empty-handed. Sagar loved Pakhi, but Pakhi's mother opposed their affair. She saw this situation as a golden opportunity to separate the two lovers. She made a deal with Sagar that she would give him the money required for his mother's treatment, but in return, he should forget Pakhi. Meanwhile, Sagar's father stole some money from Rahul without his knowing it, and it only resulted in a series of abuse made by Rahul to Sagar. A this situation, Pakhi and her father stopped a violent clash by saying that Sagar's father had not stolen the money and that, the money was borrowed from them. The film ends as Rahul's father confesses his deeds and all the misunderstandings are mutually solved. The family leads a happy life thereafter.

Cast 
 Prosenjit Chatterjee as Sagar 
 Ranjit Mallick as Suryakanta Bose, Pakhi's Father
 Rachana Banerjee as Pakhi Bose, Sagar's love interest
 Biplab Chatterjee
 Mrinal Mukherjee as Madan Hazra, manager
 Subhasish Mukherjee as Ratan, Sapna's brother and Sagar's colleague
 Dulal Lahiri as Mangal Chowdhury, Sagar & Rahul's Father
 Anamika Saha as Shanti Chowdhury, Sagar & Rahul's Mother
 Anuradha Ray as Nisha Bose, Pakhi's Mother
 Locket Chatterjee as Sapna, Rahul's Wife
 Raja Chattopadhyay as Rahul
 Piya Sengupta as Manisha
 Ramen Roy Chowdhury

Soundtrack 

Ashok Bhadra composed the music for Paribar.

Track listing

References 

2004 films
Bengali-language Indian films
Films directed by Anup Sengupta
2000s Bengali-language films
Indian family films
Indian drama films